Muted is a solo studio album by American hip hop musician Alias. It was released on Anticon in 2003. It features guest appearances from Markus Acher and Pedestrian. The album peaked at number 198 on the CMJ Radio 200 chart.

Critical reception
David Jeffries of AllMusic gave the album 3 stars out of 5, calling it "humble and approachable." He added, "Boom Bip at his most melodic and Boards of Canada minus the cheeky humor could be comparisons, but Alias has his own voice, even if he's not rapping."

Track listing

Personnel
Credits adapted from liner notes.

 Alias – production, arrangement, recording, mixing, photography
 Valerie Trebeljahr – lyrics (4)
 Markus Acher – lyrics (4), vocals (4), electric guitar (4), acoustic guitar (4)
 Dax Pierson – melodica (4)
 Mario Thaler – additional recording (4)
 Pedestrian – lyrics (11), vocals (11)
 Jeremy Goody – mastering
 Baillie Parker – executive production
 Roger Bacon – art direction

References

External links
 

2003 albums
Alias (musician) albums
Anticon albums